Zdravets (also written Zdravetz; or Здравец in Cyrillic) may refer to:

Placenames in Bulgaria 
 Zdravets, Haskovo Province, a village in Dimitrovgrad municipality
 Zdravets, Plovdiv Province, a village in Laki municipality, Plovdiv Province
 Zdravets, Razgrad Province, a village in Samuil municipality, Razgrad Province
 Zdravets, Targovishte Province, a village in Targovishte municipality, Targovishte Province
 Zdravets, Varna Province, a village in Avren municipality

Biology 
 Geranium macrorrhizum, a plant in the Geraniaceae family